Chiarjaque (possibly from Aymara ch'iyara black, jaqhi precipice, cliff) is a mountain in the Andes of southern Peru, about  high. It is in the Tacna Region, Candarave Province, Candarave District. Chiarjaque is north of Yucamane volcano.

References

Mountains of Peru
Mountains of Tacna Region